Wang Ch'ung-hui (1881–1958) was a prominent Chinese jurist, diplomat and politician who served the Republic of China from its foundation in 1912 until his death in 1958.  He was a close associate of the republic's founding father, Sun Yat-sen, an active member of the Kuomintang ("Chinese Nationalist Party"), and a judge on the Permanent Court of International Justice in the Hague.

Early life
Wang was born in Hong Kong in 1881, and graduated in 1900 from Peiyang University (later merged with Tianjin University) where he studied law. After briefly teaching at Nanyang Public School, in 1901 he continued his study in Japan, and later traveled to the United States attending the University of California, Berkeley and Yale University. He received the degree of Doctor of Civil Law from Yale Law School in 1905. Wang was called to the bar by the Middle Temple in 1907. In the same year, his translation of the German Civil Code (of 1896) into English was published. During 1907 and 1911, he studied comparative law in Germany and France.

He returned to China from London in the autumn of 1911, and when the anti-dynastic Xinhai Revolution of October 10 began, he became adviser to Chen Qimei, the revolutionary military governor of Shanghai. He represented Guangdong at the Nanking convention which elected Dr. Sun Yat-sen provisional president of the Republic of China.

Shanghai
In 1912, Wang was designated first minister of foreign affairs of the Republic of China.  After the rise of Yuan Shih-k'ai, Wang was named minister of justice in the cabinet of T'ang Shao-yi. He participated in drafting the republic's provisional constitution of 1912. Tang resigned in June 1912, and a month later Wang did the same. He moved to Shanghai and assumed the roles of vice-chancellor of Fudan University and chief editor of the Chunghua Book Company.

Guangzhou
Though he stayed out of some major political events during the early anti-Yuan era, in May 1916 he became deputy commissioner for foreign affairs of the military council in Canton, headed by Liang Ch'i-ch'ao and Ts'ai O.

Wang served as chief justice of the Chinese supreme court in 1920 and justice minister of the "Peking" or "northern" government of Li Yuan-hung in June 1922.  He briefly served as acting prime minister from September to November 1922. It was amid continued political power struggles and warlord rivalries that Wang gladly accepted an appointment as deputy judge of the Permanent Court of International Justice in the Hage from 1923 to 1925.

Beijing

Wang returned to Peking in 1925.  In 1926, he was elected to the Central Supervisory Committee of the northern government and he also briefly served as minister of education under prime minister W.W. Yen.  In mid-1927, he left Peking and joined Chiang Kai-shek's Nanking government, serving as justice minister. He was fundamental in formulating the principles underlying the Republic of China's criminal and civil codes.  When the Judicial Yuan was created in 1928, Wang was its first president.  He retained that post, and became a member of the State Council, from 1928 to 1931.  During these years, he worked to rid China of the extraterritoriality imposed by European powers and Japan. A loyal follower of Sun Yat-sen, Wang also worked to move China into the "political tutelage" phase of the revolution which would pave the way for China to become a constitutional democracy.

In 1930, Wang was elected judge on the Permanent Court of International Justice, but he delayed his acceptance as he was guiding the process of drawing up the provisional constitution of 1931.  He assumed his post in the Hague in 1931, and served out his term until 1936. He returned to China that year and was seen as a moderating influence in Nanking during the Xi'an Incident in December of that year.

Wang Ch'ung-hui served as foreign minister from March 1937 - April 1941, a painful time during which Japanese invasion would kill millions of Chinese civilians and force the ROC government to relocate from Nanking to a provisional capital in Chungking.  On August 21, 1937, he signed the Sino-Soviet Non-Aggression Pact with Soviet ambassador . This guaranteed the Soviet Union's financial support to the Kuomintang government, though they continued supporting Communist insurgents too.

In 1942, Wang became secretary general of the Chinese Supreme Defense Council. In this capacity, he accompanied President Chiang Kai-shek to India in 1942 and the Cairo Conference in 1943.  In 1943, he also began serving on the People's Political Council.

Taipei
Dr. Wang was a member of the Chinese delegation to the United Nations in San Francisco in 1945. Upon his return to China, he served as director of the Far Eastern Branch Committee of the Commission for the Investigation of Pacific War Crimes.  Wang then worked on the framing of the constitution of the Republic of China, which was promulgated on January 1, 1947.  In 1948, he was elected member of the Academia Sinica and once again became minister of justice. When mainland China fell to the Chinese Communist Party in 1949, Wang relocated to Taipei, Taiwan.

Upon his resettlement in Taiwan, Wang served on the Kuomintang's Central Reform Committee and its successor, the Central Advisory Committee. He continued to serve as president of the Judicial Yuan until his death on March 15, 1958. His son, Wang Da-hong, was an important Taiwanese architect, regarded as one of the pioneers of modernist architecture in Taiwan.

References

Columbia University: Biographical Dictionary of Republican China, Vol. 3

1881 births
1958 deaths
Chinese Christians
Foreign Ministers of the Republic of China
Justice Ministers of the Republic of China
Permanent Court of International Justice judges
Members of Academia Sinica
Tianjin University alumni
Taiwanese Presidents of the Judicial Yuan
Politicians from Dongguan
Republic of China politicians from Guangdong
Hong Kong emigrants to Taiwan
Presidents of the Judicial Yuan
Chinese judges of international courts and tribunals